Begonia rubroracteolata is a species of Begonia was found in the forests of Sarawak, Borneo, where 28 other Begonia species live. The discovery was found in 2016 by S.Julia & C.Y.Ling . The small plant grows on sandstone boulders and do well in shaded areas. This herb, which is critically endangered, was found on one site of forest conversion.

References

Begonia